Singapore Sammy is a fictional pulp character written by George F. Worts, primarily for Argosy, one of his primary markets for fiction. The adventures of Sammy Shay are one of the shorter adventure series characters which Worts wrote (although he penned shorter series, such as his interconnected novelettes which took place in a fictional Florida town called Vingo which were also published in Argosy).

Most of Worts' Singapore Sammy stories appeared in Argosy, although there were additional installments in other magazines. Singapore Sammy also made a cameo appearance in Worts' novel, Five Who Vanished, as a crane operator and engineer assigned to a defense project in World War II-era Hawaii.

Series Synopsis 

Sailor Sammy Shay roamed the South Seas on a quest to locate his father, who possessed the only copy of a will which left all of his wealth to Sammy alone. The series was well regarded in the Argosy letters column of the time. These stories take place in the South Seas, where Worts had worked as a telegraph operator on the Chinese trade route.

The Singapore Sammy series is similar to Worts' other Far East-located adventure series for Argosy, Peter the Brazen, which was serialized in that magazine during the same time.

List of stories

References

Fictional American people
Characters in pulp fiction